Casa de la Vall is a historical house in Andorra la Vella, Andorra. It is the headquarters of the General Council of Andorra. It lies just to the southwest of the Andorra National Library. It is a heritage property registered in the Cultural Heritage of Andorra.

It was built in 1580 as a manor and tower defense by the Busquets family. In 1702 it was acquired by the Consell de la Terra.

The floor of the building is rectangular. The structure has two floors. A tower in the shape of a dovecote stands in a corner. In the gardens of the building is the sculpture, designed by Francesc Viladomat, La Danse.

The ground floor is for the administration of justice with the court room. On the first floor, the main floor of the family home, is the Council Chamber, a chapel dedicated to St. Ermengol and the "closet of the seven keys" which are stored historical documents such as the Manual Digest and Politar Andorrà. The cabinet has a lock for each of the parishes of Andorra. The second floor housed, until the beginning of the nineties, the Postal Museum of Andorra, which was dismantled to provide meeting space for Comissió Tripartida, in charge of drafting the Constitution of Andorra in 1993.

At the door of the house is the Busquets coat of arms along with the coat of arms of Andorra.

Casa de la Vall is depicted on the Andorran 1 euro coin.

Literature
Diccionari Enciclopèdic d'Andorra, Àlvar Valls Oliva, Fundació Crèdit Andorrà, Andorra la Vella 2006,

References

Buildings and structures in Andorra la Vella
Houses in Andorra
Cultural Heritage of Andorra